Shifra Lerer (August 30, 1915 – March 12, 2011) was an Argentine-born American Yiddish theater actress based in New York City. Lerer appeared opposite every major Yiddish theater actor during her career, which lasted 90 years. She was also cast in film roles, including the 1997 Woody Allen film Deconstructing Harry.

Early life 
Lerer was born in the Santa Catalina colony in Argentina on August 30, 1915. Her father, a manager at a soap factory, had immigrated to Argentina from the Russian Empire to escape anti-Semitism and poverty through the sponsorship of philanthropist and banker Maurice de Hirsch. Lerer was discovered in Buenos Aires by Yiddish theater legend, producer and actor Boris Thomashefsky, who was starring in the area, when she was just five or eight years old, at the recommendation of her sister (the actress Miryam Lerer). At ten, she was participating in Yakov Botashanski's productions in a theater circle. When she was older, she studied at a Spanish-language drama school and performed for three years on the Argentinian stage. She then passed the examinations for the actors' union and became a member, playing with the star Miryam Karalova-Kambarov, then Moyshe Oysher and Florence Weiss, and finally in serious drama roles with Zygmunt Turkow in Urteyl, Hirsh Lekert, Ivan Kruger and Di glokn-tsier fun Notr-dam (The Bell-ringer (Hunchback) of Notre Dame).

Career 
Lerer played with Yakov Ben-Ami and Bertha Kalich in Friedrich Wolf's Profesor Mamlok, Strindberg's Der Foter,  and H. Leivick's Der poet is blind gevorn (The poet became blind); with Samuel (Hymie) Goldenberg in Kalmanovich's Hayntike kinder (Kids these days);  and with Maurice Schwartz in Singer's Moyshe Kalb.

In 1943 she was invited by Samuel Goldberg to perform at the Parkway Theater in Brooklyn (owned by Hymie Jacobson and his brother Irving). Her first performance was in Fun Niu York keyn Berlin; she then toured concertizing at places like the Arbeter Ring, the National Yiddish Workers Union, and Camp Boyberik. In 1946 she went back to Argentina where she worked with Ben-Zion Witler at the Mitre theater and thereafter toured and performed with him; they married in 1957. Witler died from a brain tumor in 1961.

Lerer joined the actors' union in 1949 and played in Got, mentsh un tayvl with Mikhal Mikhalesko and Gustav Berger. In 1952, she participated in Herman Yablokoff's production of Benyomin Ressler's Onkl Sem in yisroel (Uncle Sam in Israel) in the Public Theater in New York.

Personal life 
Lerer ultimately decided to settle permanently in New York City. She worked actively in the Yiddish theater circuit until she was 90 years old. Her second husband was the Yiddish actor Michael Michalovic, who died in 1987. She was best friends with the late Yiddish theater actress Mina Bern, who died in 2010.

Shifra Lerer died of a stroke in Manhattan on March 12, 2011, at the age of 95. She was buried in Block 67 of Mount Hebron Cemetery in Flushing, Queens, next to her second husband Michael Michalovic. The cemetery's Block 67 is reserved for who worked in New York City's Yiddish theater industry. Lerer was buried just rows from Boris Thomashefsky, who discovered Lerer at the age of 5 in Argentina.

Filmography

Film

References

External links

Guide to the Papers of Shifra Lerer and Ben-Zion Witler, YIVO Institute for Jewish Research, New York, NY

1915 births
2011 deaths
Yiddish theatre performers
American people of Argentine-Jewish descent
American people of Russian-Jewish descent
American stage actresses
American film actresses
Actresses from New York City
Jewish American actresses
Jewish Argentine actresses
Argentine Ashkenazi Jews
Argentine people of Russian-Jewish descent
Argentine emigrants to the United States
Burials at Mount Hebron Cemetery (New York City)
21st-century American Jews
21st-century American women
American Ashkenazi Jews